Joseph Fels Barnes (1907–1970) was an American journalist, who also served as executive director of the Institute of Pacific Relations (IPR).

Background

Barnes was born in 1907.  he graduated from Harvard University in 1927, where he was managing editor and president of the Harvard Crimson. He studied at the London School of Slavonic Studies.

Career

Institute of Pacific Relations

Barnes worked on staff in the Soviet Union and China at the Institute of Pacific Relations (IPR) from 1932 to 1934. He was a journalist for the New York Herald Tribune based in Moscow, Berlin, and New York from 1934 to 1948. That was interrupted by service as director of the Office of War Information overseas branch and Voice of America radio show (1941–1944).

PM / New York Star

Barnes was an editor of PM, which he bought from Marshall Field III with Bartley Crum and renamed New York Star.  Barnes remained editor until the Star folded in 1949.

Simon & Schuster 

Barnes worked as an editor of Simon & Schuster and was a faculty member at Sarah Lawrence College

Allegations of Communism 

Often affiliated with left-wing causes, Barnes was accused in the 1950s of being a member of the Communist Party USA by several witnesses, e.g., Whittaker Chambers as reported on in August 1951:        Whittaker Chambers, confessed former Communist courier, said that a Red leader in 1937 told him that Joseph Barnes, a member of the faculty of Sarah Lawrence College, was a member of a Communist underground cell in New York. Mr. Chambers identified his informant as J. Peters...  Mr. Barnes, former foreign editor of the New York Herald Tribune and former secretary of the American Institute of Pacific Relations who is now an editor of Simon & Schuster, New York publishers, denied the accusation – as he has on three previous occasions....    Chambers stated that Barnes had attended meetings regularly at a Communist group headed by Frederick Vanderbilt Field and held at the Central Park West home of Field's mother; Barnes dismissed the allegations by explaining that he had married Field's former wife.

Personal life and death 

Around 1935, Barnes married Elizabeth G. Brown of Duluth, Minnesota, former first wife of Frederick Vanderbilt Field.

Barnes died in 1970 of cancer in New York City.

Awards

PEN Translation Prize for The Story Of A Life

Legacy

Barnes' papers at the Library of Congress contain an unpublished biography of Wendell L. Willkie plus correspondence with Irita Taylor Van Doren, George Bergal, Norman Corwin, Bartley Cavanaugh Crum, William Fitz Gibbon, and J.L. Jones.

Works

 Behind the Far Eastern Conflict with Frederick V. Field (1933)
 Empire in the East (1934) (1970)
 Days and Nights by Konstantin Simonov (1945)
 Willkie: The Events He was Part of, the Ideas He Fought for (1952)
 The Story of a Life by Konstantin Paustovsky (1964)
 Fierce and Beautiful World: Stories by Andrei Platonov (1970)

See also
 Bartley Crum
 Frederick Vanderbilt Field

References

External links
 Library of Congress:  Joseph Barnes papers, 1930-1952

1907 births
1970 deaths
Editors of New York City newspapers
The Harvard Crimson people
People of the United States Office of War Information